The Council of State is a body established by the East Timorese Constitution to advise the President of the Republic in the exercise of many of his or her discretionary powers.

History
The East Timorese Council of State is modelled on its Portuguese counterpart, which traces its history back to 1385. Portugal was the European colonizing power in East Timor between 1702 and 1975.

The then Portuguese Council of State was declared extinct in October 1910 when the Portuguese monarchy was overthrown. In 1931, however, during the Ditadura Nacional (National Dictatorship), a National Political Council was created. Two years later, upon the adoption of Portugal's Constitution of 1933 creating the Estado Novo (New State), the National Political Council became the Council of State. The Constitution of 1933 remained in force until 1976.

The present Portuguese Council of State is a product of the 1982 review of Portugal's Constitution of 1976. The East Timorese Constitution providing for a similar East Timorese body came into force in 2002.

Composition
According to section 90 of the Constitution, the Council of State is headed by the President of the Republic and comprises the following members:

Role
Section 91 of the Constitution states that the function of the Council of State is to:

See also
Constitutional Government of East Timor

References

External links

Advisory councils for heads of state
Government of East Timor
Politics of East Timor